Ingvild Helljesen (born 1971) is a program presenter and journalist in NRK. She is the daughter of Geir Helljesen and sister of Siril Helljesen. She debuted as a channel host in NRK on 31 August 1998, and replaced Kristin Johnson, who ended the same year.

She led the quiz program Midt i blinken autumn 2003, and has also been the voice-over in some purchased documentaries from abroad. In 2004, 2005 and 2006 she presented the Norwegian points in the Eurovision Song Contest.

References 

Norwegian journalists
Norwegian women journalists
1971 births
Living people